Patricia Mayr-Achleitner (née Mayr; born 8 November 1986 in Rum) is a retired Austrian tennis player.

Mayr-Achleitner won 17 singles and seven doubles titles on the ITF Circuit in her career. On 4 May 2009, she reached her best singles ranking of world No. 70. On 29 September 2014, she peaked at No. 117 in the doubles rankings.

Playing for Austria at the Fed Cup, Mayr-Achleitner had a win–loss record of 14–15.

On 4 December 2010 she married her coach Michael Achleitner.

On 22 July 2015 after her loss at the 2015 Gastein Ladies, Mayr-Achleitner announced that the 2015 Generali Ladies Linz would be her last tournament, stating chronic back pain as the reason for her retirement from professional tennis.

Grand Slam performance timelines

Singles

Doubles

WTA career finals

Singles: 1 (runner-up)

Doubles: 1 (runner-up)

ITF finals

Singles: 32 (17 titles, 15 runner-ups)

Doubles: 14 (7 titles, 7 runner-ups)

References

External links

  
 
 
 

1986 births
Living people
People from Innsbruck-Land District
Austrian female tennis players
Sportspeople from Tyrol (state)